Khun Han is a district (amphoe) in the southern part of Sisaket province, northeastern Thailand.

History
In 1958 the minor district Khun Han (then still spelled ขุนหาร) was upgraded to a full district.

Geography
The district is bounded in the south by the Dangrek Range. Neighboring districts are (from the west clockwise): Phu Sing, Khukhan, Phrai Bueng, Si Rattana, and Kantharalak of Sisaket Province, and Oddar Meancheay of Cambodia.

Administration
The district is divided into 12 sub-districts (tambons), which are further subdivided into 145 villages (mubans). Khun Han itself is a sub-district municipality (thesaban tambon) and covers parts of tambons Si and Non Sung. Other sub-district municipalities are Si, Krawan, Non Sung, Kanthrom, and Pho Krasang, each covering the same-named sub-district except those areas belonging to Khun Han municipality. The remaining seven sub-districts each have a tambon administrative organization (TAO).

References

External links
amphoe.com (Thai)

Khun Han